Arthur Arnold Mahaffy (December 30, 1861 – November 3, 1947) was an Ontario barrister and political figure. He represented Muskoka in the Legislative Assembly of Ontario from 1903 to 1912 as a Conservative member.

He was born in Grey County, Canada West, the son of doctor John Mahaffy. In 1891, he married Alice Rosalie Thomson. He was elected to the provincial assembly in a 1903 by-election held after the death of Samuel Bridgeland.

Mahaffy later served as a judge. He died in Bracebridge on November 3, 1947.

References

External links 

1861 births
1947 deaths
Progressive Conservative Party of Ontario MPPs